The 1991–92 Scottish League Cup was the 46th staging of Scotland's second most prestigious football knockout competition. The competition was sponsored by Skol and was also known as the Skol Cup.

The competition was won by Hibs, who defeated Dunfermline Athletic 2–0 in the final at Hampden Park. This meant that Hibs won their first major trophy since winning the same competition in 1972. It marked a great turnaround in Hibs' fortunes since the summer of 1990, when the very existence of the club had been threatened by a takeover bid made by Wallace Mercer, who had intended to merge Hibs with Hearts. This period was later covered by an episode of the BBC documentary That Was The Team That Was, which revealed that Hibs player Murdo MacLeod had placed a bet on his team winning the cup.

First round

Second round

Third round

Quarter-final

Semi-final

Final

References

External links
Scottish League Cup 1991/1992 on Soccerbase

Scottish League Cup seasons
Scottish League Cup, 1991-92